NK Lipik is a Croatian football club based in the town of Lipik. Biggest success is 1/16 phase of Croatian National Cup, when they were defeated by Hajduk Split.

Honours 

Treća HNL – East:
Winners (1): 2009–10
Četvrta HNL – East:
Winners (1): 2008–09
First League of Požega-Slavonia County:
Winners (1): 2007–08

Football clubs in Croatia
Football clubs in Požega-Slavonia County
Association football clubs established in 1925
1925 establishments in Croatia
Lipik